USS Ulvert M. Moore (DE-442) was a  acquired by the U.S. Navy during World War II. The primary purpose of the destroyer escort was to escort and protect ships in convoy, in addition to other tasks as assigned, such as patrol or radar picket. Post-war she returned home bearing five battle stars; when she was reactivated for the Korean War, she returned home after that war with three more.

Ulvert M. Moore (DE-442) was named in honor of Ulvert Mathew Moore who was awarded the Navy Cross medal posthumously during the Battle of Midway.

Namesake
Ulvert Mathew Moore was born on 26 August 1917 at Williamson, West Virginia. He enlisted in the Naval Reserve on 15 October 1940 at Washington, D.C., and served as a seaman 2d class until appointed an aviation cadet on 14 January 1941. After flight training at Jacksonville and Miami, into the summer of 1941, Moore then received advanced carrier training at Norfolk, Va. He was then assigned to Torpedo Squadron 8 (VT-8) embarked on the 

As a Douglas TBD Devastator torpedo bomber pilot in VT-8, Moore took part in the pivotal Battle of Midway on 4 June 1942. Moore and the rest of the squadron attacked the Japanese aircraft carriers without fighter cover and in the face of withering antiaircraft fire and heavy Japanese fighter opposition. Though all of VT-8's aircraft were shot down, they succeeded in diverting Japanese fighter cover and preventing further launches of Japanese carrier aircraft, thus contributing to the United States Navys victory in the battle. Moore was killed during the attack and was awarded the Navy Cross posthumously and shared in the Presidential Unit Citation awarded to VT-8 for its actions in the Battle of Midway.

Construction and commissioning
She was laid down on 2 December 1943 at Houston, Texas, by the Brown Shipbuilding Co.; launched on 7 March 1944; sponsored by Mrs. L. E. Moore, mother of Ens. Moore; and commissioned on 18 July 1944, Lt. Comdr. Franklin D. Roosevelt, Jr., USNR—the son of the President—in command.

World War II Pacific Theatre operations 

Ulvert M. Moore and her sister ship subsequently sailed for the Hawaiian Islands, escorting  from San Pedro, Los Angeles, to Pearl Harbor between 24 and 30 October.

Searching for Japanese submarine I-12 

That Japanese submarine had torpedoed and sunk the American merchantman  on 30 October. Corregidors unit, designated Task Group (TG) 12.3, operated between Hawaii and the west coast until 19 November, when it returned to Pearl Harbor.

TG 12.4 conducted antisubmarine patrols en route and reached Eniwetok on 2 December and Ulithi on the 7th. Upon its arrival at the latter, the group was reclassified TG 30.6. The destroyer escort and her mates then operated on antisubmarine patrols in an area from the Marianas in the north to the Palaus in the south.

Under attack by Japanese planes 

Following this duty, Ulvert M. Moore replenished her stores at Kossol Roads, Palaus, and got underway on New Year's Day 1945 as part of the screen for TG 77.4 -- the 14 escort aircraft carriers which would furnish close air support for the landing operations on Luzon and provide air cover for the fire support group, TG 77.2 -- bound for Luzon. Snooping Japanese planes showed up on the 3d, approached the formation, but kept just out of range.

Ommaney Bay crashed by kamikaze 

While she was casting off from alongside , her lookouts noted a Japanese plane slipping into the return flight pattern of the carriers.

A heavy explosion rocked the "jeep carrier" from stem to stern, and large fires soon broke out along her starboard side. The destroyer escort headed for the scene at full speed and picked up four men—one of whom died before he could be brought aboard ship. All three suffered from flash burns and shock.

Downed one "Oscar" 

With bogies in the vicinity at 0039 on 5 January, Ulvert M. Moore went to general quarters and remained there until 0205. The destroyer escort went to general quarters three more times that day, twice for enemy aircraft and once for a contact which turned out to be friendly. At 1655, the destroyer escort received reports of approaching Japanese aircraft. Soon Japanese torpedo planes attacked the starboard side of the formation, giving Ulvert M. Moore a few moments before three "Oscar" fighters approached from port.

Rescuing survivors from USS Stafford 

The latter, holed on her starboard side aft, between the after engine room and fire room, initially seemed lost as fire broke out on board. Ulvert M. Moore closed to port and took off 54 men and 3 officers while  nudged alongside to starboard and took off additional crewmen.

Splashed one "Val" 

Ulvert M. Moore received orders to stand by Stafford, along with Halligan and the fleet tug  which arrived to take the stricken destroyer escort in tow. Gunfire from Halligan and Ulvert M. Moore splashed a "Val" dive bomber early on the 6th, before  relieved Halligan at 1849 on that day. Another Japanese plane ventured too close to the little formation on the 7th, and Ulvert M. Moore's gunners splashed it.

After transferring the crewmen of Stafford—who had been embarked in Ulvert M. Moore—to Ralph Talbot, the destroyer escort resumed antisubmarine patrols in the vicinity of Mindoro Island as part of Task Unit (TU) 77.4.1. While thus engaged, she received orders to assist  in searching for a Japanese submarine reported by a plane to be running on the surface in the vicinity. At 1557 on 30 January, La Vallette made contact and dropped a depth charge barrage but observed no results and soon lost the contact. The group continued to search throughout the night with negative results.

Sinking Japanese submarine Ro-115 

On 31 January, Ulvert M. Moore secured from the search at 1607 and steamed to join up with TG 77.4. Bell closed to  before the enemy submarine—identified by postwar accounting as the Japanese submarine —submerged. At 2037, Ulvert M. Moore received orders to assist in the search and arrived at the scene to complete the hunter-killer group. The destroyer escort detected the submarine at 2152 but briefly lost the contact. Regaining the contact at 2210, she fired her first Hedgehog pattern four minutes later. At 2227, she fired another |Hedgehog pattern; and three explosions rumbled up from below—muffled noises intermingling with "crunching noises." Twice more, the destroyer escort attacked like a persistent terrier. Another pattern of 7.2-millimeter projectiles left the Hedgehog mount at 2302, hit the water and plunged downward; 12 seconds later a sharp "crack" followed, as did "distinct and definite bubbling and hissing noises." Men on the destroyer escort's fantail reported seeing a large bubble burst on the surface.

Ulvert M. Moore closed the vicinity of the strong contact at 2336 and again at midnight. The eighth attack proved to be the killer; for, 15 seconds after the Hedgehog projectiles hit the water, three violent explosions sent out concussions felt by topside personnel in Ulvert M. Moore and the three other ships. A last explosion rumbled up from below—the death agony of the Ro-boat and a "definite bluish light similar to burning gas" was noted. For two hours, the ships searched the vicinity to confirm the "kill". Men topside in Ulvert M. Moore noted the strong odor of diesel oil, an object which resembled a life jacket, small boxes and pieces of deck planking, and a considerable amount of paper.

Supporting Iwo Jima and Okinawa operations 

Ulvert M. Moore retired to Ulithi and remained there from 6 to 18 February before departing with other ships of CortRon 70 and Tulagi, as part of TU 50.7.3 to provide antisubmarine protection for the carriers which would furnish close air support for the forces attacking Iwo Jima. The ship thus began her most grueling period, as she steamed continuously for 78 days to support this operation and the subsequent one against Okinawa. The destroyer escort operated with Tulagi and, later, southeast of Okinawa. During the Okinawa operation, President Roosevelt died on 12 April, a loss felt not only by the nation and the Fleet, but by his son Comdr. Roosevelt, Ulvert M. Moores commanding officer.

Major repairs at Ulithi 

Returning to Guam on 6 June, Ulvert M. Moore soon shifted to Ulithi for major repairs. On 19 June, the destroyer escort put to sea with TG 30.8, the group providing logistics support for Admiral William F. Halsey's air strikes against the Japanese home islands. She operated with this unit until returning to Guam on 24 July.

Atomic bombs strike Japanese cities 

Two atomic bombs—dropped on Hiroshima and Nagasaki on 6 and 9 August, respectively—hastened the collapse of Japanese resistance. At this time, Ulvert M. Moore was operating with Salamaua on antisubmarine patrol east of Formosa, a duty in which she remained engaged until putting into Leyte on 25 August.

Tokyo Bay end-of-war ceremonies 

Ulvert M. Moore screened TG 32.1, the supporting escorts for TF 32, then en route to Tokyo Bay for the Japanese surrender. On 2 September, the escort vessel entered Tokyo Bay, in the words of her ship's historian, as "a fitting culmination to approximately 14 months of strenuous operation."

After conducting antisubmarine and mine patrol duties in Japanese home waters, escorting Japan-bound transports with occupation forces embarked, and destroying floating mines with light-caliber gunfire, Ulvert M. Moore operated in the Philippines into the winter before she returned via Pearl Harbor to the United States. Arriving at San Diego, California, on 22 November, the destroyer escort was decommissioned there on 24 May 1946 and placed in reserve.

Reactivated for Korean War 

Ulvert M. Moore remained inactive until the onset of the Korean War in the summer of 1950. The destroyer escort was accordingly recommissioned at San Diego on 27 January 1951 and assigned to CortRon 9. After shakedown, she departed San Diego on 19 April, bound for the Far East.

Formosa patrol duty 

Arriving at Sasebo, Japan, on 17 May 1951, Ulvert M. Moore joined Task Force 72 for Formosa patrol duty, standing guard off Taiwan, to deter against possible communist Chinese incursions against the Nationalist Chinese. The destroyer escort was detached from this duty on 10 June and arrived at Buckner Bay two days later. She then conducted hunter-killer exercises as she steamed north to Japan.

Arriving at Yokosuka on 16 June, she departed there nine days later and headed for the west coast of Korea to join the British carrier  for screen and patrol duty. In August, Ulvert M. Moore participated in bombardment and covering operations at Wonsan, Korea, during minesweeping operations there and came under fire for the first time from communist shore batteries. Her guns covered the retirement of the more lightly constructed minecraft and earned the ship a "well done." After conducting frequent patrols north to Songjin and Chongjin, Korea, for shore bombardment and anti-junk patrol, the destroyer escort put into Sasebo on 25 August for refit.

The following month, Ulvert M. Moore continued her operations off the coast of Korea undertaking bombardment and call-fire missions in support of United Nations ground troops at Wonsan, Songjin, and Chongjin on the east coast of Korea. Near the end of the month, the ship proceeded towards Okinawa, conducting hunter-killer exercises en route.

Struck by North Korean gunfire 

However, Typhoon Ruth prevented successful completion of their evolution and forced Ulvert M. Moore and the other ships of CortRon 9 back towards Korea. Arriving off Hungnam on 14 October, the destroyer escort proceeded to her interdiction patrol station and watched for enemy junk traffic off the coast. Early on the morning of 17 October, communist shore batteries shelled the ship, lobbing a salvo close aboard the escort vessel. One shell hit the steering engine room, and fragments killed one man almost instantly. In addition, the splinters wounded an officer and an enlisted man. Efficient and rapid damage control work soon repaired the damage, allowing the ship to return to action. Ulvert M. Moore remained on the station—conducting shore bombardment, serving on antisubmarine patrol, and patrolling to locate and destroy enemy junks or mines—until she departed Korean waters on 6 November, arriving at San Diego, via Japan, on 26 November.

Second Korean tour 

After an overhaul at the San Francisco Naval Shipyard and antisubmarine and air defense training off the coast of California, Ulvert M. Moore got underway for the Far East and her second tour off Korea, departing San Diego on 18 October 1952.

Ulvert M. Moore subsequently took part in operations interdicting communist coastal rail traffic and harassing enemy logistics movements. She remained thus engaged until 19 December before conducting a period of hunter-killer exercises off Okinawa between 27 December 1952 and 9 January 1953.

On 31 March, Ulvert M. Moores commanding officer assumed duties as Commander Task Group (CTG) 95.3, to enforce Japanese and South Korean fishing rights off Korean coastlines, before she sailed for the west coast of the United States, making port at San Diego on 6 June 1953. After conducting local operations, including antisubmarine, air defense, and type training evolutions, Ulvert M. Moore again sailed for the Far East, departing the west coast for Yokosuka on 20 May 1954.

Weathering Pacific Ocean typhoons 

During this tour, the ship's duties consisted primarily of escorting fleet tankers and ammunition ships. In addition, she also participated in a marine landing exercise, a hunter-killer training operation, and conducted antisubmarine exercises with Colombian, British, and Dutch naval units. She weathered three major typhoons during the deployment: "Grace", while moored at Sasebo; "June", during a sortie with a typhoon-evasion task force from Tokyo Bay; and "Lorna", while at sea off the southeast coast of Japan. Upon completion of her tour, Ulvert M. Moore departed Yokosuka, bound for San Diego via Midway Island and Pearl Harbor. While en route home, she encountered a storm which battered her for 10 days and produced many heavy rolls in the storm-tossed seas.

Additional WestPac deployments 

Ulvert M. Moore subsequently conducted three more WestPac deployments into 1958. During one of these, in early 1958, she participated in Operation Skyhook.

Final decommissioning 

Placed out of commission, in reserve, on 10 October 1958 at Astoria, Oregon, the destroyer escort remained inactive until struck from the Navy List on 1 December 1965.

Military awards 

Ulvert M. Moore (DE-442) was awarded five battle stars for her World War II service and three for Korea.

In Popular Culture 

In the opening dockyard scene of the film On the Town, the sailors are seen enthusiastically disembarking from USS Ulvert M. Moore.

That is incorrect. The ship in the movie is the destroyer USS NICHOLSON DD-442

References

External links 
 NavSource Online: Destroyer Escort Photo Archive - USS Ulvert M. Moore (DE 442)

John C. Butler-class destroyer escorts
Ships built in New Jersey
1944 ships
World War II frigates and destroyer escorts of the United States
Ships sunk as targets
Maritime incidents in 1966
Shipwrecks of the California coast